Major General Senén Casas Regueiro (30 July 1934 in Bombí - 6 August 1996) was a Cuban politician. He was the Cuban Minister of Transportation from 1989 till his death. He was also the First Deputy Minister of Defence and the Chief of Staff of the Cuban Army. He was a brother of another Cuban politician Julio Casas Regueiro.

Legacy 
The new railway station of Santiago de Cuba, rebuilt in 1997, was named after him.

Sources 
 solvision.co.cu (Senén Casas Regueiro: Un General guantanamero, Agustín Pérez)

References 

1934 births
1996 deaths
Transport ministers of Cuba
Communist Party of Cuba politicians
People from Guantánamo Province